Judge Edgerton may refer to:

Alonzo J. Edgerton (1827–1896), judge of the United States District Court for the District of South Dakota
Henry White Edgerton (1888–1970), judge of the United States Court of Appeals for the District of Columbia Circuit